Ammu Abhirami is an Indian actress who has appeared in Tamil and Telugu films. She made her acting debut with 2017 Tamil film Bairavaa, alongside Vijay. She is known for playing pivotal roles in Ratsasan (2018), Thambi (2019) and Asuran (2019). She is the 2nd Runner Up in Cooku with Comali season 3.

Career
Abhirami's first releases were Bairavaa (2017), En Aaloda Seruppa Kaanom (2017) and Theeran Adhigaaram Ondru (2017), where she portrayed supporting roles. She then portrayed a schoolgirl who faces trouble in Ratsasan. Later she reprised the same role in the film's Telugu remake, Rakshasudu (2019), featuring alongside Bellamkonda Sreenivas and Anupama Parameswaran. She appeared in Thuppakki Munai (2018), playing a teenage girl who was raped and murdered.

In 2019, she appeared in Vetrimaaran's drama Asuran (2019), where she featured in a leading role opposite Dhanush. Ammu was selected after being recommended by producer S. Thanu, who she had earlier worked with on Thuppakki Munai (2018). She portrayed the role of Maari, a schoolgirl in rural Tamil Nadu during the 1960s.

Filmography

Films

Television

Music videos

Awards and nominations

References

External links 
 

Living people
Actresses in Tamil cinema
Actresses in Telugu cinema
21st-century Indian actresses
Indian film actresses
Actresses from Chennai
2000 births
Tamil actresses